Dichomeris concinnalis is a moth in the family Gelechiidae. It was described by Joachim François Philibert Feisthamel in 1839. It is found on the Moluccas.

References

Moths described in 1839
concinnalis